The Unknown Industrial Prisoner is a Miles Franklin Award-winning novel by Australian author David Ireland.

In 1978 a film version was planned, to be produced by Richard Mason and directed by Arch Nicholson, with Ken Cameron also working on it. Funding was from Film Australia. However, the Minister for Home Affairs Bob Ellicott cancelled the film on the grounds it was uncommercial, a rare instance of political interference in the Australian film industry.

References

External links
 Middlemiss.org

Novels by David Ireland
1971 Australian novels
Miles Franklin Award-winning works
Novels set in Sydney
Angus & Robertson books